Francisco Alonso Lutteroth (September 19, 1952 — July 6, 2019), commonly referred to as Paco Alonso was the owner of the professional wrestling promotion Consejo Mundial de Lucha Libre (CMLL), the world's oldest wrestling promotion. Alonso was the grandson of CMLL founder Salvador Lutteroth and took control of the company in 1987

Career
Paco Alonso was the son of the daughter of Salvador Lutteroth, who founded the promotion under the name La Empresa Mexicana de Lucha Libre (EMLL). Alonso began working for EMLL in 1975, around the same time as Salvador Lutteroth's son, Salvador Lutteroth Jr., who took control of the promotion. Over the next five years, Alonso worked in a promotional capacity while Chavo Lutteroth II ran the company. Lutteroth Jr. did not command the same respect as his father, and by 1987, he handed over control and later ownership to Paco Alonso, who had the ability and intelligence to make the company evolve and succeed. Despite being the technical owner of CMLL, his daughter Sofia Alonso is in charge of the company's business-related activities.

Alonso was relatively reclusive from the public eye and only gave a few interviews in his time in charge of the promotion.  However, it is estimated that he was responsible for cumulatively drawing over 80,000,000 fans throughout his career at CMLL, based on 24 shows a week each with 2,000 attendance. Alonso was inducted into the Wrestling Observer Newsletter Hall of Fame Class of 2008 with a 73% vote.  Along with Martín Karadagian, he was one of only two inductees for the year.

Alonso's leadership style was described as "hands off", normally content to leave the matchmaking to his booking team and staying out of the day-to-day leadership of the promotion. Alonso was also known for holding a grudge against certain wrestlers he felt had betrayed him, having banned both Octagón and Konnan from CMLL forever and even refused to pay tribute to Antonio Peña after his death. There was also a falling out between El Hijo del Santo and CMLL that led Alonso to decree that none of CMLL's working partners were to use El Hijo del Santo on their shows, and when International Wrestling Revolution Group refused Alonso broke off a seven-year working relationship with the promotion.

Championships and accomplishments
Wrestling Observer Newsletter awards
Wrestling Observer Newsletter Hall of Fame (Class of 2008)

References

2019 deaths
1952 births
Businesspeople from Mexico City
Professional wrestling promoters
People from Mexico City
Lucha libre